Collazo is a surname first found in Velletri, a town in the province of Rome, Italy.

Jerry Collazo - Banker  
People with the surname Collazo
Will Collazo JR, (born 1983) Film Director
Ariel Collazo, Uruguayan politician 
José Bordonada Collazo, Puerto Rican singer
Tony Collazo 
Julito Collazo (1925–2004),  master percussionist
Luis Collazo (born 1981), welterweight boxer 
Manuela Santiago Collazo (born 1938), Puerto Rican politician 
Oscar Collazo (1914–1994), attempted assassin of U.S. President Harry S. Truman
Patrice Collazo (born 1974), French rugby union footballer
Ramón Collazo, Uruguayan carnival artist.
Teófilo Collazo, Uruguayan politician.
Willie Collazo (born 1979), professional baseball pitcher

Surname popularity
There are approximately 1,797 people in Spain with the surname Collazo, making it the 2,926 most common in the country.
It is ranked 2,661 out of 88,799 in the United States.

References